Strategy+Business (stylized in lowercase in its logo) is a business magazine focusing on management issues and corporate strategy. Headquartered in New York, it is published by certain member firms of the PricewaterhouseCoopers network. Prior to the separation of Booz & Company (now Strategy&) from Booz Allen Hamilton in 2008, strategy+business was published by Booz Allen Hamilton, which launched the magazine, then titled Strategy & Business, in 1995. Full issues of strategy+business appear in print and digital edition form on a quarterly basis, and other original material is published daily on its website.

Articles cover a range of industry and organizational topics that are of interest to CEOs and other senior executives as well as to business thinkers, academics, and researchers. The articles, written in English, are authored by a mix of leading figures from both the executive suite and academia in addition to journalists and consultants from PwC.

The magazine's founding editor-in-chief, Joel Kurtzman, coined the term thought leadership when he published interviews with influential business figures under the rubric “Thought Leaders.”  Today, interviews with “Thought Leaders” remain a recurring column in the print magazine and on the website.

History
The late Joel Kurtzman, formerly editor-in-chief of the Harvard Business Review and a business editor and columnist at the New York Times—together with a group of partners at Booz & Company, then part of Booz Allen Hamilton—founded strategy+business in 1995. A collection of Kurtzman's Thought Leader columns was published in book form, Thought Leaders: Insights on the Future of Business (Jossey-Bass, 1997). Kurtzman served as editor-in-chief between 1995 and 1999.

Randall Rothenberg succeeded Kurtzman, serving as editor-in-chief between 2000 and 2005. Previously, Rothenberg had been an editor of the New York Times Magazine and had also served as the newspaper's advertising columnist. He redesigned strategy+business, introduced the “Best Business Books” feature, and expanded coverage of the burgeoning electronic media infrastructure. Rothenberg's first major issue, which was published in February 2000, was titled “E-Business: Lessons from Planet Earth,” and it contained articles that prophesied the dot-com crash that occurred several months later. During Rothenberg's tenure, the strategy+business staff was formally brought into the Booz Allen Hamilton operation; prior to that, the magazine was a standalone, contracted enterprise.

By 2002, the firm's e-commerce businesses had hit serious headwinds, and the future of strategy+business was not certain. However, Booz Allen's partners decided to keep publishing it. Rothenberg began developing what he and Cesare Mainardi (then an influential partner in North America's commercial practice and a former chief executive officer at Strategy&) called the “functional agenda.” They started to build a body of research and practice around six major functions: strategy and leadership; innovation; organizations and people; marketing and sales; mergers and restructuring; and operations. Many of the regular, annual features in strategy+business—including the “Global Innovation 1000” survey of top R&D spenders and the “CEO Succession” report on CEO tenure—date back to this effort.

Art Kleiner succeeded Rothenberg in 2005 and served as editor-in-chief until January 2020. A writer, lecturer, and commentator, Kleiner is the author of The Age of Heretics: A History of the Radical Thinkers Who Reinvented Corporate Management (Currency/Doubleday, 1996; rev’d. ed., 2008, Jossey-Bass)  and Who Really Matters: The Core Group Theory of Power, Privilege, and Success (Currency/Doubleday, 2003).

During Kleiner's tenure, the magazine has published influential articles on such topics as neuroscience and leadership (a 2006 article by David Rock and Jeffrey Schwartz led to the establishment of the field of neuroleadership), women in emerging markets (“The Third Billion”), capabilities-driven strategy, investment in infrastructure, organizational culture, long-wave theories of economic change, and market dislocation. In 2020, financial and economic journalist Daniel Gross was named editor-in-chief. 

After a private equity takeover by the Carlyle Group in 2008, Booz Allen Hamilton was split into two entities. At that time, strategy+business became the flagship publication of the global commercial firm, Booz & Company (now known as Strategy&). Strategy& is part of PricewaterhouseCoopers, which acquired the former Booz & Company on April 3, 2014.

Readership
Strategy+business claims a global audience of more than 1,000,000 readers, with a circulation of about 600,000 through its print and digital editions, including sales at newsstands and airports, and an opt-in audience of more than 115,000 for its email newsletters. The magazine has drawn more than 500,000 Web registrants and 350,000-plus readers on social media. According to a recent study analyzing s+b’s readership, 34 percent of s+b print readers are C-suite and senior executives and 39 percent have served on a board of directors. Approximately 80 percent of readers have pursued post-graduate degrees, 92 percent hold professional or managerial positions, and their average household net worth is more than US$1.6 million.

Contributors
Over the years, the magazine's contributors have included Warren Bennis, Ram Charan, Stewart Brand, Nicholas Carr, Denise Caruso, Glenn Hubbard, Sheena Iyengar, Rosabeth Moss Kanter, Jon Katzenbach, A.G. Lafley, Franco Modigliani, Kenichi Ohmae, C.K. Prahalad (including his posthumous last article), Sally Helgesen, Marshall Goldsmith, Sylvia Ann Hewlett, and Peter Senge. Those interviewed as thought leaders include Bob Wright, Vineet Jain, Sir Martin Sorrell, Tom Peters, Joe Kaeser, Jonathan Haidt, Bran Ferren, Frances Hesselbein, Andrew Ng, Geoffrey West, Mark Bertolini, Ellen Langer, Zhang Ruimin, Rita Gunther McGrath, Christine Bader, Eric Ries, Douglas Rushkoff, David Kantor, Douglas Conant, Cynthia Montgomery, Otto Scharmer and Arawana Hayashi, Clayton Christensen, Betty Sue Flowers, Rakesh Khurana, Carrie Cullen Hitt, Philip Bobbitt, John Chambers, Arie de Geus, Gary Hamel, Charles Handy, Daniel Kahneman, John Kao, Sylvia Nasar, Carlota Perez, Paul Romer, Anne-Marie Slaughter, Shelly Palmer, Vineet Jain, Kenji Yoshino, Carolyn Everson, Ian Bremmer, John Coyle (speed skater), Sally Blount, Michael Useem, Harbir Singh, Daniel Gross, Linda Hasenfratz, and Meg Wheatley. The magazine also features the work of a variety of illustrators and photographers, including Guy Billout, Seymour Chwast, Lars Leetaru, the late Peter Gregoire, Dan Page, and Heads of State.

Editorial approach
Strategy+business offers a mix of bylined articles by corporate leaders, business thinkers, academics, researchers, journalists, and PwC and Strategy+business consultants. The articles are primarily written for chief executives and other senior managers, with the goal of providing ideas and analysis that can serve as the basis for thoughtful action.

Leading articles and ideas
Regular features include “Thought Leader” interviews; “Recent Research” columns, which are short reports on the latest academic studies and their implications for real-world corporate action; "Young Profs" interviews and columns, which are interviews with up-and-coming business leaders and academics; and “Books in Brief,” which are reviews of new books on business and management topics. “Best Business Books,” a roundup and assessment of the year's most important books, is published in the winter issue.

Strategy+Business also publishes the “Global Innovation 1000,” a report that examines corporate spending on research and development each year, based on research conducted by Strategy&. Some of the magazine's most popular past pieces have been collected in “15 Years, 50 Classics,” published in 2010. In 2015, s+b celebrated two decades with a special collection of online essays, including an interactive history of management theory titled "20 Questions for Business Leaders."

Best Business Books
Strategy+business also publishes an annual feature called “Best Business Books,”  one of the few places where business books are evaluated and reviewed systematically. Writers of these essays (who select the books in each category) have included Bethany McLean, Catharine P. Taylor, Theodore Kinni, Frances Cairncross, Marc Levinson, Ken Favaro, Clive Crook, R. Gopalakrishnan, Sally Helgesen, Krisztina "Z" Holly, Walter Kiechel III, Steven Levy, Nell Minow, James O’Toole, Howard Rheingold, Kenneth Roman, Phil Rosenzweig, Michael Schrage, David Warsh, James Surowiecki, Duff McDonald, J. Bradford DeLong, and Dov Zakheim.

References

External links
 website

Business magazines published in the United States
Quarterly magazines published in the United States
Magazines established in 1995
Magazines published in New York City